César Marcano (born 31 October 1957) is a Venezuelan footballer. He played in three matches for the Venezuela national football team in 1991. He was also part of Venezuela's squad for the 1991 Copa América tournament.

References

External links
 

1957 births
Living people
Venezuelan footballers
Venezuela international footballers
Place of birth missing (living people)
Association football defenders
Zulia F.C. managers